Druce is a surname. Notable people with the surname include:

Duncan Druce (1939–2015), British composer and musicologist
Eliot Druce (1876–1934), English cricketer
Frank Druce (1875–1954), English cricketer
George Claridge Druce (1850–1932), British botanist
Herbert Druce (1846–1913), British entomologist
Hamilton Herbert Druce (1869–1922), British entomologist, son of the above
John Druce (born 1966), Canadian ice hockey player
Joseph Druce (born 1965), American prisoner who murdered John Geoghan
Thomas W. Druce (born 1961), former member of the Pennsylvania House of Representatives, US